Fronczak is a Polish surname. It may refer to:
 Henryk Fronczak (1898–1981), Polish rower
 Paul Fronczak (born Jack Rosenthal), abandoned as a toddler
 Kevin Ray Baty (born Paul Fronczak, 1964–2020), kidnapped as a newborn

See also
 

Polish-language surnames